The Dear Departed: Selected Short Stories is a collection of short stories by Northern Ireland-born novelist Brian Moore. It was published in the United Kingdom by Turnpike Books in 2020, 21 years after his death.

Contents

Reception
Reviewing the book in The Spectator, Wendy Erskine said: "[T]he stories of this collection display the concerns that would preoccupy the Belfast-born Moore throughout his career — those attempts to abandon the values and constraints of the past, to escape conservative, authoritarian homes... But leaving aside any relationship to future output, these are, simply, great stories. In ‘Uncle T’, a young Irish emigrant and his bride find that the ‘publishing’ job offered by a relative and his wife in New York is not all it seems. The story is deft, nuanced and notable in the way it elicits sympathy for all four main characters...There is delightful variety. A super-natural tale of Sicilian bandits has shades of Hammer House of Horror, and is no less enjoyable for that. ‘Lion of the Afternoon’ presents a variety show performed for children with disabilities. Written in 1957, its language is undeniably of the time, but it’s a beautiful, sad and compassionate story of difference and identification."

Writing in The Irish News, James Doyle said that "Moore's short stories are as restless in their variety as his novels". Although several of them share many of the themes and atmosphere of Moore's novel Judith Hearne, "they are more consciously influenced by Joyce and give an insight into Moore’s own feelings about his father and life as an emigrant... Other stories from The Dear Departed display a humorous side to Moore. They include the supernatural tale of a Sicilian bandit who kidnaps a magician – it could be one of Roald Dahl’s Tales of the Unexpected – while the most joyous story allows Moore to take comic revenge on religion and express the freedom he found in Canada."

References

Sources
 Crowley, Michael. "A Brian Moore Bibliography" in The Canadian Journal of Irish Studies, Vol. 23, No. 2 (Dec 1997), pp. 89–121. DOI: 10.2307/25515225

External links
Turnpike Books

1950 short stories
1953 short stories
1956 short stories
1957 short stories
1960 short stories
1961 short stories
2020 in literature
2020 short story collections
Books published posthumously
Canadian short story collections
Irish short story collections
Works by Brian Moore (novelist)